Saint Caesarius  may refer to:
Saint Caesarius of Arles (6th-century bishop)
Saint Caesarius of Nazianzus (4th-century physician)
Saint Caesarius of Africa, also Saint Caesarius of Terracina (2nd-century martyr)